Several incidents have taken place on the Israeli–Syrian ceasefire line during the Syrian Civil War, straining the relations between the countries. The incidents are considered a spillover of the Quneitra Governorate clashes since 2012 and later incidents between Syrian Army and the rebels, ongoing on the Syrian-controlled side of the Golan and the Golan Neutral Zone and the Hezbollah involvement in the Syrian Civil War. Through the incidents, which began in late 2012, as of mid-2014, one Israeli civilian was killed and at least 4 soldiers wounded; on the Syrian-controlled side, it is estimated that at least ten soldiers were killed, as well as two unidentified militants, who were identified near Ein Zivan on Golan Heights.

Timeline

Reactions
 – On 12 November 2012, Israeli prime minister Benjamin Netanyahu said "we are closely following the events and will respond accordingly," and that Israel "won't allow its borders to be breached or its citizens to be fired upon."

On 6 January 2013, it was reported that Israel would be building an improved security fence in the ceasefire line between the Israeli-occupied and Syrian-controlled zones of the Golan Heights. Netanyahu stated that the Syrian army had largely "backed off" from the area, leaving it in control of "global jihad operatives" and that the fence would protect the "Jewish state" from "infiltrations and terror".

On 30 March 2018, Chief of General Staff of the Israel Defense Forces, Gadi Eizenkot, confirmed in an interview with Maariv that the Israeli Air Force continued to conduct operations in Syria since the February 2018 Israel–Syria incident.

On 22 May 2018, during a conference in Herzliya, a senior Israeli Air Force officer said that Israel continued to strike targets in Syria since the May 2018 Israel–Iran incidents.

German Magazine Contra questioned the occurrence of the attack alleging that "Israel has insisted that the S-300s wouldn't interfere with its ability to attack Syria, but in the space of over a month since then, not a single media report on such an attack has been made".

 – On 18 September 2018, after the downing of the Russian IL-20M, Vladimir Putin attributed it (sic) to a "chain of tragic circumstances" and denied that the IDF was involved in the crash.

 – On 13 November 2012, the Syrian government, through the United Nations Disengagement Observer Force (UNDOF), pledged to halt firing toward Israeli territory.

 Syrian opposition – Turkey's Anadolu news agency reported that the Free Syrian Army released a statement accusing Israel of attempting to "aid Assad's criminal regime" by firing into Syria.

See also

 Iran–Israel conflict during the Syrian Civil War
 Syrian civil war spillover in Lebanon
 Syrian–Turkish border clashes during the Syrian Civil War
 Timeline of the Arab–Israeli conflict
 War in Iraq (2013–2017)

References

Israel–Syria border
Spillover of the Syrian civil war
Foreign involvement in the Syrian civil war
Israeli involvement in the Syrian civil war
Israel–Syria military relations
Iran–Israel proxy conflict
Iran–Israel conflict during the Syrian civil war
Hezbollah–Israel conflict
2010s in Syria
2020s in Syria
2010s in Israel
2020s in Israel
2012 in the Syrian civil war
2013 in the Syrian civil war
2014 in the Syrian civil war
2015 in the Syrian civil war
2016 in the Syrian civil war
2017 in the Syrian civil war
2018 in the Syrian civil war
2019 in the Syrian civil war
2020 in the Syrian civil war
2021 in the Syrian civil war
Israeli military-related lists